Omanpe (also spelled Omape) is a town in western Ghana near the border with Côte d'Ivoire.  It lies some distance from the coast.

The town is part of the Western Region.

References 

Populated places in the Western Region (Ghana)